Damiano Pippi (born 23 August 1971 in Castiglione del Lago) is a volleyball player from Italy, who won the silver medal with the Italian men's national team at the 2004 Summer Olympics in Athens, Greece.

Individual awards
 1993 FIVB World League "Best Digger"

State awards
 2004  Officer's Order of Merit of the Italian Republic

References
 CONI profile

1971 births
Living people
Italian men's volleyball players
Volleyball players at the 2004 Summer Olympics
Olympic volleyball players of Italy
Olympic silver medalists for Italy
Olympic medalists in volleyball
Medalists at the 2004 Summer Olympics
People from Castiglione del Lago
Sportspeople from the Province of Perugia